SS Bilis was the seventh ship of the seven B-class oil tankers. She was previously known as Geomitra. She is named after the bilis, a species of fish found in Brunei and Malaysia.

Development 
B-class oil tankers were built by CNIM-La Syne, France in 1972 to 1975. They served Gaz de France for around 14 years, the B-class vessels were acquired and delivered to BST in December 1986. Previously referred to as the G-class vessels chartered under Shell Tankers United Kingdom (STUK). They continued to provide reliable service to the company and its client especially BLNG. Four out of the seven BST vessels were manned by a fully Bruneian crew with the exception of senior management; a feat yet to be achieved but not impossible.

All B-class oil tankers were taken out of service in 2011. They are all steam powered.

Construction and career 
SS Geomitra was ordered in 1972 and completed in 1975. The vessel was placed in service in 1975 and taken out of service to be sold in 1986. In 1986, Brunei Shell acquired Geomitra and renamed her Bilis. Throughout her career she routinely traveled between Brunei and Japan carrying oil. On 7 April 2011, the ship was delivered to  Zhoushan, China, for scrapping. She was demolished on 2 December 2014.

References 

Ships of Brunei
Ships built in France
1974 ships